We Are Leo is a Pop Artist and Producer from the Chicago area. The project also currently features contributions from singer Joseph Sanborn and bassist Howard Lalgee and was originally founded by David Duffield and Jonny Duffield with support from Ben Kasica and Joe Snyder and band members Doug Weier, Andrew Alojipan. Since 2011 We Are Leo has released 4 albums, 10 singles (nearing 30 Million Global streams to date) and has toured extensively appearing at most major Christian Festivals, Youth Conferences such as Acquire the Fire,  and over 125 schools with faith-based non-profit Remedy Live.   

They are best known in collaboration with YouTube’s Dude Perfect which features 7 of their songs in popular videos. The band commenced as a musical entity in 2011, with their first release, Hello, an extended play that was released on August 30, 2011 with Skies Fall Records. Their first studio album, Hello Again, was released on June 23, 2012, from Skies Fall Records. The subsequent studio album, Fightback Soundtrack, was released in 2014 from Dream Records. This was followed by The Rush and the Roar, which was released on May 26, 2017. They have since released a string of singles to music streaming services.

Music history
The band commenced as a musical entity in 2011, with their first release, Hello, an extended play, that was released on August 30, 2011, with Skies Fall Records. Their first studio album, Hello Again, was released on June 23, 2012, from Skies Fall Records. The subsequent studio album, Fightback Soundtrack, was released on October 14, 2014, by Dream Records.

Members

David Josiah Duffield: Vocals, Keys, Production
Joseph Sanborn: Vocals
Matt Gainsford: Guitars

Discography
Studio albums
 Hello Again (June 23, 2012, Skies Fall)
 Fightback Soundtrack (October 14, 2014, Dream)
 The Rush & The Roar (May 26, 2017, Dream)
EPs
 Hello (August 30, 2011, Skies Fall)
Singles

References

External links
 Official website

Musical groups from Wisconsin
2011 establishments in Wisconsin
Musical groups established in 2011